The ARM Cortex-A17 is a 32-bit processor core implementing the ARMv7-A architecture, licensed by ARM Holdings.  Providing up to four cache-coherent cores, it serves as the successor to the Cortex-A9 and replaces the previous ARM Cortex-A12 specifications.  ARM claims that the Cortex-A17 core provides 60% higher performance than the Cortex-A9 core, while reducing the power consumption by 20% under the same workload.

ARM renamed Cortex-A12 to a variant of Cortex-A17 since the second revision of the A12 core in early 2014, because these two were indistinguishable in performance and all features available in the A17 were used as upgrades in the A12.

New features of the Cortex-A17 specification, not found in the Cortex-A9 specification, are all improvements from the third-generation ARM Cortex-A, which also includes the Cortex-A7 and Cortex-A15:
 Hardware virtualization and 40-bit Large Physical Address Extensions (LPAE) addressing
 Full-system coherency, bringing support for the big.LITTLE architecture
 NEON unit, for floating-point data and SIMD processing
 Deeper integer instruction pipeline, with 10–12 stages
 Full out-of-order execution design with load/store units

Modern Linux kernel implementations will report and support the above features thus : 
 
 processor       : 3
 model name      : ARMv7 Processor rev 1 (v7l)
 BogoMIPS        : 48.00
 Features        : 
 CPU implementer : 0x41
 CPU architecture: 7
 CPU variant     : 0x0
 CPU part        : 0xc0d
 CPU revision    : 1

See also 

 ARM architecture
 Comparison of ARMv7-A cores
 Comparison of ARMv8-A cores
 List of applications of ARM cores
 List of ARM cores

References

External links 
 

ARM processors
ARM Holdings IP cores